The women's 3000 metres race of the 2013–14 ISU Speed Skating World Cup 4, arranged in Sportforum Hohenschönhausen, in Berlin, Germany, was held on 6 December 2013.

Martina Sáblíková of the Czech Republic took her third straight win, while Claudia Pechstein of Germany was the runner-up for the third straight time, and Ireen Wüst of the Netherlands took third place. Jorien ter Mors won the Division B race on a time that would have given her the win in Division A.

Results
The race took place on Friday, 6 December, with Division B scheduled in the morning session, at 11:38, and Division A scheduled in the afternoon session, at 16:00.

Division A

Division B

References

Women 3000
4